Gerald Claude Fielding (6  July 1902 – 3 June 1956) was a British actor, born in Darjeeling, India. He died in Encino, California.
He and his brother,  Claude Anthony Karl Fielding, born 1904, appeared together in The Magician and The Garden of Allah. The date of birth of Gerald  is misquoted generally as 6 July 1910. His Petition for USA Naturalization, number 68461, of September 1939 gives the correct date, 6 July 1902.

Filmography

References

External links

1902 births
1956 deaths
British male film actors
People from Darjeeling
20th-century British male actors
British expatriate male actors in the United States
British people in colonial India